Kwon Hyuk-Bin is a Korean billionaire who co-founded Korea's third largest gaming company, Smilegate, maker of the popular Crossfire games. Crossfire has gone on to become the most popular first-person shooter game in history. He owns 100% of Smilegate Holdings, which he founded in 2002.

Education and Career
Kwon holds an electrical engineering degree from Sogang University. After a failed education startup, 4Csof, Kwon turned down a software position at Samsung to pursue his goal of developing video games. He partnered with Tencent to break into the Chinese market.

Philanthropy
Kwon has been involved in starting Orange Farm, South Korea's largest private incubator and has donated over $5 million to building schools in Vietnam and China. He has also contributed over $2 million to his alma mater at Sogang University.

References

Living people
South Korean businesspeople
South Korean billionaires
Sogang University alumni
Year of birth missing (living people)